The 1987 Virginia Slims of Kansas was a women's tennis tournament played on indoor hard courts at the Kansas Coliseum in Wichita, Kansas in the United States and was part of the Category 1+ tier of the 1987 WTA Tour. It was the seventh edition of the tournament and ran from February 2 through February 28, 1987. First-seeded Barbara Potter won the singles title and earned $15,000 first-prize money as well as 190 ranking points.

Finals

Singles
 Barbara Potter defeated  Larisa Savchenko 7–6(8–6), 7–6(7–5)
 It was Potter's 1st singles title of the year and the 5th of her career.

Doubles
 Svetlana Parkhomenko /  Larisa Savchenko defeated  Barbara Potter /  Wendy White 6–2, 6–4

References

External links
 ITF tournament edition details
 Tournament draws

Virginia Slims of Kansas
Virginia Slims of Kansas
Virgin
Virgin
Virginia Slims of Kansas